"Pirotehnimata" (Greek: "Πυροτεχνήματα") is a song recorded by Greek pop singer Helena Paparizou and the third single from Vrisko To Logo Na Zo. The music video of the song is nominated for the Most Sexy Appearance in a Video and the Video of the Year at Mad Video Music Awards.

Background 
Released as the third single from the album Vrisko To Logo Na Zo, "Pirotehnimata" was originally scheduled for release in September, but the release date was pushed back due to the strong radio airplay for "I Kardia Sou Petra".  The song was officially released as a radio single on December 22, 2008, while the video premiered on a special episode of Mega Star on December 27, 2008. Music is by Giorgos Sambanis with lyrics by Giannis Doksas.

Music video
The music video for the song was directed by Alexandros Grammatopoulos, as were her previous four videos. It was filmed in December at Iera Odos in front of a giant video screen, and features a more international feel.

Charts
"Pirotehnimata" debuted and peaked at number two on the Billboard Greek Digital Singles Chart for the week of January 24, 2008. On January 7, 2009 the Top30 most played songs of 2009 were published at Cypriot radio station site Super Fm. "Pirotehnimata" was the 8th most played Greek song in 2009 with 12171 plays, and 10th between the most played Greek-international songs.

As of July 2015, "Pirotehnimata" is the 30st best selling digital single ever in Greece.

References

2008 singles
Helena Paparizou songs
House music songs
MAD Video Music Award for Best Pop Video
MAD Video Music Award for Video of the Year
Songs written by Giorgos Sabanis
Synth-pop songs
2008 songs
Sony BMG singles
Greek-language songs